The 2020 TCR Denmark Touring Car Series (known for sponsorship reasons as the 2020 HC Container TCR Denmark Touring Car Series) is the inaugural season of the TCR Denmark Touring Car Series. The season started on the 18/19 April at Jyllandsringen and will end on the 10/11 October at Padborg Park.

Calendar
Five events are set to take place in Denmark. Two of the former rounds were scheduled to be supporting the STCC TCR Scandinavia Touring Car Championship. 

Each round will consist of three 15-minute and 1-lap races, the starting order for the first race will be based on the results from qualifying while the second race will utilise a reversed grid of the top eight cars from qualifying. The third and final race will have its grid decided by the most points gathered from the first two races.

The 2020 calendar was announced on 17 December 2019 with the addition of a round supporting the Copenhagen Historic Grand Prix announced on 19 February 2020.

The opening round of the season was then moved to 2–3 May 2020 due to the  COVID-19 pandemic. Round 2 of the championship, that was due to take place in Aarhus, supporting the Classic Race Aarhus event, was postponed due to the COVID-19 pandemic until 2021.

On 1 May 2020, a new, preliminary, calendar was released featuring a double header round at Jyllandsringen.

Test days
The official test days for the season were announced on 16 January 2020. The announced dates were the 1, 2 and 16 April at Jyllandsringen. These will also serve as the series' media days for photos and interviews for the drivers and team to take place. These were later postponed to 9–10 June.

Teams and drivers

Summary

 LM Racing, run by Lars Mogensen, will compete in the championship using two Volkswagen Golf GTI TCR cars for ex-Formula One and Corvette Racing driver Jan Magnussen and 2019 ADAC GT Masters driver Nicolai Sylvest.
 Massive Motorsport will compete in the championship entering DS3 Cup Denmark driver Kenn Bach and Three-time Danish Thundersport Championship winner Kasper Jensen. Casper Elgaard, who was originally scheduled to enter the series with the team, announced on 28 January that he has left the team. Bach will drive an FK8 Honda Civic Type R previously driven by Josh Files for KCMG while Jensen's car is not yet confirmed.
 A pair of ex-Kristoffersson Motorsport Volkswagen Golf GTI TCRs will be entered by 2019 Yokohama SuperCup Denmark champion Rene Povlsen and runner-up Allan Kristensen. The team for which the two drivers will compete is yet to be confirmed.
 Insight Racing will enter an Alfa Romeo Giulietta Veloce TCR for Norwegian driver Kristian Sætheren, who competed in the 2019 TCR Scandinavia Series for the team and an Alfa Romeo Giulietta TCR for British GT driver Jacob Mathiassen. Johnny Vejlebo will also  compete in the championship for Insight in a Peugeot 308 TCR, driving in the Trofeo Championship.
 TPR Motorsport will compete in the championship using a Volkswagen Golf GTI TCR with 2019 Danish Thundersport Championship driver and team owner Toni Persic driving the car. Casper Elgaard was later confirmed to drive for team after leaving Massive Motorsport, alongside Daniel Träger in a pair of Honda Civic Type R TCR cars.
 Two-time Danish Touringcar Champion Michael Carlsen will compete in the championship in a Peugeot 308 TCR.
 Danish Yokohama Super Cup driver Mikael Kildevæld will compete in the championship in a Volkswagen Golf GTI TCR for his team, Kildevæld Racing.
 Danish Thundersport Championship driver Michael Markussen will compete in the championship in a Peugeot 308 TCR for his team, Markussen Racing. Michelle Gatting will guest star alongside Markussen in the opening round.
 Kim Lund will compete in the championship in an ex-PWR CUPRA León TCR driving in the Trophy Championship for Madbull Racing.
 Jonas Lindhard will compete in the championship in a Volkswagen Golf GTI TCR driving for his family team, Lindhard Motorsport.
 Martin Andersen will compete in the championship in a Hyundai i30 N TCR driving for his own team, Andersen Motorsport.

Results and standings

1 – Original race 1 was replaced by a qualifying session for the then Race 1, and normal points were awarded.

2 – Original race 1 was replaced by a qualifying session for the then Race 1, and normal points were awarded.

Scoring system

Drivers' championship

† – Drivers did not finish the race, but were classified as they completed over 75% of the race distance.

Teams' championship

† – Drivers did not finish the race, but were classified as they completed over 75% of the race distance.

References

External links 
 

Motorsport competitions in Denmark
Denmark
TCR